Taupo is an amateur football club based in Taupō, New Zealand. It competes in the NRFL Southern Conference.

History
The club was founded as Taupo United in 1956. The club was officially formed on 12 March 1956 after a meeting chaired by J. L. Burge at Rickit's Supper Room. Mr F. Howes was elected the club's first president. Taupo played its first game on 14 April 1956 against Whakatāne, losing 3–4. The first game to be played in Taupo was on 16 June against the Crusaders of Rotorua, with the game ending in a nil-all draw. Taupo had its first win when it beat the Rotorua team, Caledonian United, at home 3–1 on 14 July. By the end of its first season, Taupo had played 17 competition and friendly games of which it won four, drew four and lost nine, with 34 goals scored for and 18 against. In 1957, Taupo withdrew from Bay of Plenty competitions due to players having work commitments on Saturdays. The club reformed again in 1962, this time with the name Taupo Soccer Club. In 1969, the club changed its name again to Taupo.

Taupo has entered the Chatham Cup, New Zealand's premier knock-out tournament, a number of times. It had its best run in the 2001 Chatham Cup when it reached the final 16, before losing 4–1 to Eastern Suburbs.

References

External links
Club website

Association football clubs in New Zealand
1956 establishments in New Zealand